Love Sensation is the sixth and final studio album recorded by American singer Loleatta Holloway, released in 1980 on the Gold Mind label.

History
The album features the title track, which peaked at #1 on the Hot Dance Club Play chart. The second single release, a cover of Otis Redding's "I've Been Loving You Too Long", failed to chart. The album was remastered and reissued with bonus tracks in 2013 by Big Break Records.

Track listing

Personnel
Keith Benson, Brian Brake, Roger Hawkins, Steve Gadd – drums
Jimmy Williams, Dan Hartman, Anthony Willis, Gordon Edwards – bass
Norman Harris, T.J. Tindall, Phil Houghton, Bobby Womack, Eric Gale – guitars
Cotton Kent, Eugene Curry, Dan Hartman, Patrick Moten, Richard Tee – keyboards
Dan Hartman – percussion
Larry Washington, David Cruse, Ron Tyson – congas
Jimmy Maelen – timbales
Barbara Ingram, Evette Benton, Carla Benson, Dan Hartman, Blanche Napoleon, Bobby Womack, The Waters, Patrick Moten, Madeline Strickland – background vocals
Don Renaldo and His Strings and Horns, Patrick Moten and His Strings and Horns – strings
Muscle Shoals Horns – horns

Charts
Singles

References

External links 
 

1980 albums
Loleatta Holloway albums
Albums produced by Dan Hartman
Albums produced by Norman Harris
Albums produced by Bobby Womack
Albums recorded at Sigma Sound Studios
Gold Mind Records albums